Dungna Gewog (Dzongkha: གདུང་ན་,Doongna Gewog) is a gewog (village block) of Chukha District, Bhutan. The gewog has an area of 165.4 square kilometres and contains 9 villages.

References

Gewogs of Bhutan
Chukha District